GABA transporter 1 (GAT1) also known as sodium- and chloride-dependent GABA transporter 1 is a protein that in humans is encoded by the SLC6A1 gene and belongs to the solute carrier 6 (SLC6) family of transporters. It mediates gamma-aminobutyric acid's translocation from the extracellular to intracellular spaces within brain tissue and the central nervous system as a whole.

Structure 
GAT1 is a 599 amino acid protein that consists of 12 transmembrane domains with an intracellular N-terminus and C-terminus.

Function 

GAT1 is a gamma-aminobutyric acid (GABA) transporter, which removes GABA from the synaptic cleft by shuttling it to presynaptic neurons (where GABA can be recycled) and astrocytes (where GABA can be broken down). GABA Transporter 1 uses energy from the dissipation of a Na+ gradient, aided by the presence of a Cl− gradient, to translocate GABA across CNS neuronal membranes. The stoichiometry for GABA Transporter 1 is 2 Na+: 1 Cl−: 1 GABA. The presence of a Cl−/Cl− exchange is also proposed because the Cl− transported across the membrane does not affect the net charge. GABA is also the primary inhibitory neurotransmitter in the cerebral cortex and has the highest level of expression within it. The GABA affinity (Km) of the mouse isoform of GAT1 is 8 μM.

In the brain of a mature mammal, glutamate is converted to GABA by the enzyme glutamate decarboxylase (GAD) along with the addition of vitamin B6. GABA is then packed and released into the post-synaptic terminals of neurons after synthesis. GABA can also be used to form succinate, which is involved in the citric acid cycle. Vesicle uptake has been shown to prioritize newly synthesized GABA over preformed GABA, though the reasoning behind this mechanism is currently not completely understood.

The regulation of the modular functioning of GATs is highly dependent on a multitude of second messengers and synaptic proteins.

Translocation cycle 
Throughout the translocation cycle, GAT1 assumes three different conformations:

 Open-to-out. In this conformation, 2 extracellular Na+ ions are co-transported into the neuron along with 1 GABA and 1 Cl− that bind to the empty transporter, thus making it fully loaded. In prokaryotes, it has been found that transport does not require Cl−. In mammals, the Cl− ion is required to offset the positive charge of the Na+ in order to maintain the proper membrane potential.
 Occluded-out. Once fully loaded, this conformation prevents the release of ions/substrate into the cytoplasm or the extracellular space/synapse. The Na+, Cl−, and GABA are bound to the transporter until it changes conformation.
 Open-to-in. The transporter, which was previously facing the synapse, becomes inward facing and can now release the ions and GABA into the neuron's cytoplasm. Once empty, the transporter occludes its binding site and flips to become outward facing so a new translocation cycle can begin.

Clinical significance 
Research has shown that schizophrenia patients have GABA synthesis and expression altered, leading to the conclusion that GABA Transporter-1, which adds and removes GABA from the synaptic cleft, plays a role in the development of neurological disorders such as schizophrenia. GABA and its precursor glutamate have opposite functions within the nervous system. Glutamate is considered an excitatory neurotransmitter, while GABA is an inhibitory neurotransmitter. Glutamate and GABA imbalances contribute to different neurological pathologies..

Imbalance in the GABAergic neurotransmission is involved in the pathophysiology of various neurological diseases such as epilepsy, Alzheimer's and stroke.

A study on genetic absence epilepsy rats from Strasbourg (GAERS) found that poor GABA uptake by GAT1 caused an increase in tonic current of GABAA. In the two most understood forms of absence epilepsy, synaptic GABAA receptors including GAT1 play a major role in seizure development. Blocking GAT1 in non-epileptic control (NEC) rats caused tonic current to increase to a rate similar to that of GAERS of the same age. This common cellular control site shows a possible target for future seizure treatments.

Glutamate and GABA have also been found to interact within the nucleus tractus solitarii (NTS), paraventricular nucleus (PVN), and rostral ventrolateral medulla (RVLM) of the brain to modulate blood pressure.

Interactions 

SLC6A1 has been shown to interact with STX1A.

See also 
 Solute carrier family
 GABA transporter 2
 GABA transporter 3
 SLC6A1 epileptic encephalopathy

References

Further reading 

 
 
 
 
 
 
 
 
 
 
 
 
 
 

Solute carrier family
Neurotransmitter transporters